The Three Witches is a 2015 South Korean evening daily drama series starring Choi Jung-won, Seo Ji-seok, Yoo Ji-in and Shin Dong-min. It aired on SBS from December 14, 2015 to June 10, 2016, airing every Monday to Friday at 19:20 for 122 episodes.

Cast and characters

Main cast
Choi Jung-won as Oh Dan-byul
Seo Ji-seok as Shin Kang-hyun
Lee Hae-in as Moon Hee-jae
Yu Ji-in as Yang Ho-duk
Shin Dong-mi as Gong Se-shil
Danny Ahn as Baek Eun-yong

People around Oh Dan-byul
Jung Han-yong as Gong Nam-soo
Kim Sun-kyung as Seo Mil-rae
Lee Seul-bi as Seo Hyang
Lincoln Paul Lambert as Leo

People around Shin Kang-hyun
Choi Il-hwa as Moon Sang-gook
Na Moon-hee as Chun Geum-ok
Jung Wook as Wang Yoo-sung

Baek Eun-yong's family
Kim Seung-hwan as Bae Geum-yong
Kim Min-hee as Hong Chun-seol (Hong Chun-ae)

Extended cast
Son Hwa-ryung as Ok Goo-seul
Jung Byung-chul as Moon Sang-gook's secretary 
Han Eun-sun as Na Soon-shim
Choi Won-myeong as Kang Hoon-nam
Lee Ha-yool as Jin Tae-won
Kim Woo-suk as Moon Sang-gook (young)
Jin Hyun-kwang as Detective Kim Ji-hoon

Guests / Cameos
Kim Jeong-hoon as Gong Joon-young
Kang Ji-sub

Trivia
This drama is Choi Jung-won's second collaboration and the director Jeong Hyo after Stars Falling from the Sky.

References

External links
  
 

Seoul Broadcasting System television dramas
Korean-language television shows
2015 South Korean television series debuts
2016 South Korean television series endings
South Korean romance television series
South Korean melodrama television series
South Korean fantasy television series
Television series by RaemongRaein